Jharra Chhetri are the subgroup of the Chhetri caste who are socio-religiously considered the purest among all Chhetri subcastes. Jharra Chhetri wear the six threaded Janai (sacred thread). Although Khatri Chhetri and Matwali Chhetris or Pawai Chhetri outnumber Jharras but almost all Notable people from Chhetri community are exclusively Jharras like Bogati, Basnet/Basnyat,Thapa, Karki, Kunwar, Khadka, Budathoki, Katuwal, Mahat and so on.  

Jharra Chhetri  are Kshatriya in Hindu Social status. They follow Bratabandha ceremony and proclaim a caste-based supremacy over other Kshatriya communities like Thakuri (Rajputs) and Pawei Khasa Chhetri based on the socio-religious gradation of purity. Most of them were historically warriors' nobility ruler's administrator or government official as their surname suggest. 

Jharra Chhetris with heterogenous surnames are also called as Bahuthariya, such as Thapa (Bagale/Lamichhane/Godar/Suyal/Puwar), Karki (Mudula/Lama/Sutar), Basnet (Khaptari/Shripali/Khulal), Khadka (Kalikote/Puwar/Khulal) whereas those with homogenous are known as "Ekthariyas" like Rayamajhi, Katwal, Raut, Kkunwar etc. They are mostly descendants of different rank holding Indo-Aryan people in different feudal kingdoms of Medieval Himalayas.

Jharra Chhetris are strict Tagadhari hindus  to the extent that Jharras who consumed alcohol and pork were even degraded to Matwali Chhetri (liquor drinkers) and robbed from Jharra status.

Etymology and Background

The meaning of the terminology "Jharra" is 'pure' and 'unpolluted' while the terminology "Chhetri" is a direct derivative or a Nepalese vernacular of the Sanskrit word Kshatriya.

Chhetri Background

Chhetris along with Brahmins and Thakuris are considered among the twice born castes called Tagadhari in Nepal and they wear the sacred thread called the Yagnopavita. Chhetris are considered among the Pahadi caste groups and they speak Nepali language as their mother tongue which is highly influenced by Sanskrit. Maternal cousin marriages are considered incest and are strictly forbidden among all Chhetri subcastes.

Culture and Traditions

Definition and distinction with Thima
They are strict hindus . Hypergamous marriages are traditionally considered acceptable among Chhetris. The children born from the union of a Chhetri man and his married Chhetri wife are considered "Jharrā" (meaning: 'pure') while those children born from the union of a Chhetri man and a Matwali woman or a Chhetri widow are considered "Thimā" (meaning: 'hybrid'). Jharrā children are traditionally assigned a higher ritual status above the Thimā children. 

A Jharra Chhetri would accept ritually relevant food items from only among respective Jharra Chhetris in terms of traditional touchability. They were demoted to Matwali Chhetri if they consumed foods like Pork Alcohol etc in different places.  During the rituals of annual sacrifice to the clan deities, only Jharra Chhetris would be allowed to enter into the inner sphere of the shrine. 

A Jharrā boy would be given a six threaded Janai (sacred thread) at his Hindu passage of rite Bartaman ceremony while a Thimā boy would be given only a three threaded Janai (sacred thread). A Thimā son would inherit a sixth of the ancestral property compared to that of the Jharrā son.

Socio-religious standing
Jharra Chhetris claim the highest social ranking among all subgroups of Chhetris. It is either "allegedly pure" Khas tribe origin or Rajput origin that is considered to have constituted the Jharra division. Jharra Chhetris are ritually observed to be higher than other non Jharra Chhetris based on the concept of purity of descent. The concept of purity distinguishes Jharra Chhetris from the children of other inter-ethnic or inter-caste marriages. Jharra Chhetris are considered to have maintained a caste based superiority over other Thakuri Khatri and Matwali/pawai Chhetri sub-castes based on the gradation of purity. 

Marriage with Khatri Chhetri is quite common nowadays but still marriage between a Jharra and matwali/pawais is still rare. Most Jharra Chhetris were landlords' military man and farmers. From Unification of Nepal to King Mahendra's Panchayat rule they occupied majority of government posts. They also have Monopoly in and other major posts in Nepal Army including Army chief.

Touchability
On the basis of concept of Jharra caste purity, some Chhetri men traditionally do not consume food cooked by their lower caste wives.

Notable People
Bhimsen Thapa
Post Bikram Bogati
Babu Bogati
Amar Singh Thapa
Bhakti Thapa
Bal Narsingh Kunwar
Swarup Singh Karki
Balbhadra Kunwar
Queen Tripurasundari of Nepal
Abhiman Singh Basnet
Mathabarsingh Thapa
Pyar Jung Thapa
Purna Chandra Thapa
Surya Bahadur Thapa
Rookmangud Katawal
Yogi Naraharinath
Hari Bhakta Katuwal

See also
Khatri Chhetri, a Chhetri subcaste
Caste system in Nepal
Kshatriya
Varna (Hinduism)
Pande dynasty
Kaji
Rajputs of Nepal

References

Books

 

 

Castes
Kshatriya communities
Khas people
Ethnic groups in Nepal